Jeffery Oliver Miller is an American trombonist, vocalist, composer, arranger and bandleader primarily known for his work in jazz and pop music. He was worked with Delfeayo Marsalis, Wynton Marsalis, Jon Batiste & Stay Human, Preservation Hall Jazz Band and John Legend, among others.

Early life

Born and raised in New Orleans' Algiers neighborhood (15th Ward), Miller gained early and ubiquitous exposure to jazz culture and history. He is the great-great grandnephew of Papa John Joseph, a New Orleans bass player who worked with Buddy Bolden (and notably passed away during an especially raucous performance of "When the Saints Go Marching In" with the Preservation Hall Jazz Band).

Miller sang at home and church from an early age. Although initially drawn to the drumset, Miller began to study the trombone around age ten or eleven, inspired by his middle school band director Keith Hart. He progressed quickly and impressed professional trombonist Terrance Taplin, who encouraged Delfeayo Marsalis to audition Miller for his Uptown Jazz Orchestra. After sitting-in with the group at New Orleans' famed jazz club Snug Harbor, Miller joined the group at age 14.

He studied academics at Benjamin Franklin High School and music at New Orleans Center for Creative Arts.  While a sophomore in high school, he performed with the Preservation Hall Jazz Band at Carnegie Hall.

During high school, he appeared for three seasons of the HBO series Treme, in which he played a student of Antoine Batiste, the fictional trombonist depicted by Wendell Pierce.

In 2013, Miller was selected as one of twelve younger musicians to participate in the Vail Jazz Workshop in Vail, Colorado. The experience solidified his desire to pursue music as a lifelong calling.

Musical career

Miller moved to New York City in 2014 to study at The Juilliard School where he completed both undergraduate and master's degrees.  During his early years in New York, he also toured with the trumpeter Wynton Marsalis, the Count Basie Orchestra as well as Canadian indie rock band Arcade Fire.

Miller released the single "Lose Control" in summer 2018. The track draws heavily on diverse influences including hip-hop, jazz, and R&B.

He recorded on Jon Batiste's studio album Hollywood Africans as well as contributed trombone solos to John Legend's Grammy-nominated A Legendary Christmas (featuring Esperanza Spalding). He joined both Legend and Spalding to perform "Have Yourself A Merry Little Christmas" on NBC's The Voice.

In May 2020, he released his album Songs About Women, on which he both sang and played trombone alongside saxophonist Chris Bittner, pianist Sean Mason, drummer Brian Richburg Jr., and bassist Philip Norris. The album focused on compositions about and dedicated to women who raised and inspired him, including his grandmother, Patricia, and twin sister, Justice. That fall, Miller composed music for a re-imagined rendition of Shakespeare's Measure for Measure.  The production was set in 1979 New Orleans, and directed by L.A. Williams and The Public Theater's Mobile Unit.

He has been a frequent member of pianist Jon Batiste's house band on The Late Show with Stephen Colbert on CBS, the Christian McBride Big Band and has performed with the Louisiana Philharmonic Orchestra, among others.

Awards
ASCAP Foundation Louis Prima Award

Discography

As leader

As sideman

References

External links 

1996 births
Living people
American jazz trombonists
American jazz singers
Male trombonists
American jazz composers
Juilliard School alumni
21st-century trombonists
21st-century American male musicians